Joseph Bertrand (born March 23, 1991) is an American professional basketball player who last played for the Dresden Titans. He played college basketball for the University of Illinois.

High school career
Bertrand played for Sterling High School, and was coached by Peter Goff. In high school, Bertrand was a two-time Illinois High School Association (IHSA) Slam Dunk Champion. Bertrand was named a member of the 2009 Illinois All-State Team as selected by the Illinois Basketball Coaches Association.

Collegiate career
Entering the University of Illinois during the 2009–10 season, Bertrand suffered a tear in his right Lateral meniscus during individual, preseason workouts. The injury, which required surgery, forced Bertrand to take a Medical redshirt as a true freshman. During his redshirt freshman season, Bertrand saw limited time off the bench as the 2010–11 Fighting Illini featured a starting line-up of four seniors and a regular rotation of a former Illinois Mr. Basketball winner and a former McDonald's All-American in Brandon Paul and Jereme Richmond, respectively. In total, Bertrand saw action in 15 games during the 2010–11 season.

College statistics

|-
| style="text-align:left;"| 2009–10
| style="text-align:left;"| Illinois
| style="text-align:center;" colspan="11"|Did not play due to Medical redshirt
|-
| style="text-align:left;"| 2010–11
| style="text-align:left;"| Illinois
| 13 || 0 || 3.8 || .538 || .000 || .750 || 0.5 || 0.3 || 0.08 || 0.15 || 1.3
|-
| style="text-align:left;"| 2011–12
| style="text-align:left;"| Illinois
| 32 || 14 || 20.2 || .538 || .300 || .733 || 2.7 || 1.3 || 0.34 ||0.16 || 6.5
|-
| style="text-align:left;"| 2012–13
| style="text-align:left;"| Illinois
| 35 || 5 || 22.7|| .502 || .321 || .773 || 4.1 || 0.6 || 0.91 || 0.17|| 7.3
|-
| style="text-align:left;"| 2013–14
| style="text-align:left;"| Illinois
| 35 || 23 || 25.1 || .481 || .385 || .680 || 3.8 || 0.8 || 0.66 || 0.00 || 8.5
|-

Professional career
After going undrafted in the 2014 NBA draft, and talking to teams in both Austria and China, Bertrand joined Larochette in Luxembourg. On November 1, 2014 Bertrand was selected by the Westchester Knicks as their first pick in the 2014 NBA Development League Draft. Bertrand was then waived by the Westchester Knicks at the end of training camp on November 13, 2014. Bertrand later signed with Nauticos de Mazatlan of the CIBACOPA league in Mexico. On November 12, 2015, Bertrand signed with the Halifax Hurricanes of the National Basketball League of Canada (NBL). On March 6, 2016, he was waived by Halifax, however, he signed with the Island Storm nine days later.

References

External links
Profile at FIBA.com
Profile at Latinbasket.com
Profile at FightingIllini.com

1991 births
Living people
American expatriate basketball people in Canada
American expatriate basketball people in Luxembourg
American expatriate basketball people in Mexico
Basketball players from Illinois
Illinois Fighting Illini men's basketball players
Island Storm players
Venados de Mazatlán (basketball) players
People from Sterling, Illinois
Shooting guards
American men's basketball players